Kala Bagan Krira Chakra (also known as Kalabagan Krira Chakra) is a team that played List A cricket in the Dhaka Premier League from 2013–14 to 2017–18. Kalabagan is a suburb of Dhaka. "Kalabagan Krira Chakra" translates as "Kalabagan Sports Circle".

List A results
 2013-14: 10 matches, won 2, finished tenth
 2014-15: 13 matches, won 4, finished tenth
 2015-16: 11 matches, won 6, finished eighth
 2016-17: 11 matches, won 4, finished ninth
 2017-18: 13 matches, won 2, finished last
Several players captained the side in 2013–14, Abdur Razzak was the captain in 2014–15, Mashrafe Mortaza in 2015–16, Mohammad Ashraful and Tushar Imran in 2016–17, and Muktar Ali in 2017–18.

Records
Since the league gained List A status, Kala Bagan Krira Chakra's highest score is 127 by Mohammad Ashraful in 2017–18, and the best bowling figures are 6 for 42 by Mashrafe Mortaza in 2015–16.

External links
 List A matches played by Kala Bagan Krira Chakra

References

Dhaka Premier Division Cricket League teams
1982 establishments in Bangladesh